Bogumiłów may refer to the following places:
Bogumiłów, Bełchatów County in Łódź Voivodeship (central Poland)
Bogumiłów, Piotrków County in Łódź Voivodeship (central Poland)
Bogumiłów, Sieradz County in Łódź Voivodeship (central Poland)
Bogumiłów, Greater Poland Voivodeship (west-central Poland)
Bogumiłów, Lubusz Voivodeship (west Poland)